The Principality of Anhalt-Dornburg was located in what is today Germany. It was created in 1667 following the death of Prince John VI and the partition of Anhalt-Zerbst with Anhalt-Mühlingen being created along with Anhalt-Dornburg for the younger sons of Prince John VI. The principality lasted until 1742 when Princes Christian August and John Louis II inherited Anhalt-Zerbst.

Princes of Anhalt-Dornburg 1667–1742
John Louis I 1667–1704 
John Louis II 1704–1742
John Augustus 1704–1709 (co-regent)
Christian Louis 1704–1710 (co-regent)
John Frederick 1704–1742 (co-regent)
Christian Augustus 1704–1742 (co-regent)
United with Anhalt-Zerbst in 1742.

External links
Regnal chronology

1742 disestablishments
States and territories established in 1667
House of Ascania
Anhalt-Dornburg
1667 establishments in the Holy Roman Empire